General Salah Hassan Jama, also known as Salah Liif, is a Somali military official. On 21 July 2007, he was appointed Somalia's Chief of Army. Jama served in this capacity until 11 June 2008, when he was replaced with Said Dheere Mohamed.

References

Living people
Somalian military leaders
Somalian generals
Year of birth missing (living people)